Néréide was a 52-gun frigate of the French Navy. She took part in the Battle of Veracruz soon after her commissioning.

As a transport, she took part in the Crimean War.

She was eventually decommissioned in 1887, and struck in 1896.

See also
 List of French sail frigates

Footnotes

Notes

Citations

References
 

Age of Sail frigates of France
1836 ships
Maritime incidents in May 1839